The men's épée competition in fencing at the 2012 Summer Olympics in London was held on 1 August at the ExCeL London Exhibition Centre. There were 30 competitors from 24 nations. Rubén Limardo of Venezuela won the gold medal – the country's only medal of the 2012 Games as well as the country's first medal in men's individual épée. Norway's Bartosz Piasecki won silver (that nation's first medal in the event, as well) and Jung Jin-Sun from South Korea took bronze.

Background

This was the 26th appearance of the event, which was not held at the first Games in 1896 (with only foil and sabre events held) but has been held at every Summer Olympics since 1900.

Three of the eight quarterfinalists from 2008 returned: fifth-place finisher Jung Jin-Sun of South Korea, sixth-place finisher Radosław Zawrotniak of Poland, and eighth-place finisher Bas Verwijlen of the Netherlands. Paolo Pizzo of Italy was the reigning (2011) World Champion, with 2010 champion Nikolai Novosjolov of Estonia also competing in London.

Senegal and Uzbekistan each made their debut in the event. France and the United States each appeared for the 24th time, tied for most among nations.

Qualification

Nations were limited to three fencers each from 1928 to 2004. However, the 2008 Games introduced a rotation of men's team fencing events with one weapon left off each Games; the individual event without a corresponding team event had the number of fencers per nation reduced to two. The men's rotation started with foil (2008) and épée (2012), with sabre scheduled to skip its team event in 2016. Thus, the maximum for individual épée in 2012 was two per nation.

There were 30 dedicated quota spots for men's épée. The first 12 spots went to the top fencers by world ranking. Next, 8 more men were selected from the world rankings based on continents: 2 each from Europe, the Americas, Asia/Oceania, and Africa. Finally, 10 spots were allocated by continental qualifying events: 4 from Europe, 2 from the Americas, 3 from Asia/Oceania, and 1 from Africa.

Additionally, there were 8 host/invitational spots that could be spread throughout the various fencing events. Great Britain chose not to use any of its places in the men's épée.

Competition format

The épée competition, following the format introduced in 1996, consisted of a five-round single-elimination bracket with a bronze medal match between the two semifinal losers. Fencing was done to 15 touches or to the completion of three three-minute rounds if neither fencer reached 15 touches by then. At the end of time, the higher-scoring fencer was the winner; a tie resulted in an additional one-minute sudden-death time period. This sudden-death period was further modified by the selection of a draw-winner beforehand; if neither fencer scored a touch during the minute, the predetermined draw-winner won the bout.

Schedule 

All times are British Summer Time (UTC+1)

Results

Top half

Bottom half

Finals

Results summary

References

Men's epee
Men's events at the 2012 Summer Olympics